A chalupa is a specialty dish of south-central Mexico, including the states of Hidalgo, Puebla, Guerrero, and Oaxaca.

Description
Chalupas are made by pressing a thin layer of masa dough around the outside of a small mold, in the process creating a concave container resembling the boat of the same name, and then deep frying the result to produce crisp, shallow corn cups. These are filled with various ingredients such as shredded chicken, pork, chopped onion, chipotle pepper, red salsa, and/or green salsa. They can in many cases resemble tostadas since both are made of a fried or baked masa-based dough.

Traditional chalupas, as found in Cholula, Puebla, are small, thick, boat-shaped fried masa topped only with salsa, cheese and shredded lettuce. Other regions in Mexico add variations, which can include chorizo, pork, shredded chicken, or refried beans, in addition to the classic cheese, salsa, and lettuce toppings. In other instances, the fried masa shape is round, resembling a tostada, with traditional chalupa toppings.

In the United States
The widespread popularity of chalupas across Mexico has also influenced Mexican-style restaurant fare in the neighboring United States. Among notable examples in the US are fast-food versions, which, unlike its Mexican namesake, are fried tortilla shells topped with multiple ingredients. A thicker tortilla shell and multiple toppings have more in common with Navajo frybread and the use of frybread as the basis for a taco than the traditional savory chalupa found in Mexico.

See also

List of Mexican dishes

References

Cuisine of the Southwestern United States
Mexican cuisine
New Mexican cuisine
Tex-Mex cuisine
Tortilla-based dishes